Võõpsu is a small borough in Räpina Parish, Põlva County, Estonia. As of the 2011 Census, the settlement's population was 195.

References

Boroughs and small boroughs in Estonia
Populated places in Põlva County
Räpina Parish
Kreis Werro